Thomas Ross is an American retired ice hockey defenseman and marine who was a two-time All-American for Boston University.

Career
Tom Ross was a star varsity defenseman for Boston University during the program's renaissance in the mid 1960s. Ross was never much of an offensive threat himself, scoring just 2 goals in 79 games, but his defensive ability endeared him to his teammates, coach and the Terrier faithful. part of Jack Kelley's first recruiting class for BU, Ross didn't receive much attention during his sophomore season but he did help the Terriers prevent nearly 30 additional goals against than the previous season. The team had a breakout year in 1965 and Ross led BU to its best season in 17 years, compiling a 25–6 record and winning their first conference title. BU's power was built around the defense which allowed the fewest goals per game in the nation (2.09). Ross placed on both the All-American and First Team All-ECAC rosters and was named as the ECAC Most Outstanding Defenseman. The Terriers faltered in the conference semifinal, however, and missed out on the NCAA Tournament.

As a senior Ross was again the leader for the BU defensive corps. The team wasn't as strong as they had been the year before but they still managed a 2nd-place finish in their conference. In the ECAC Tournament the team again lost in the semifinal, however, because Cornell had finished second and all Ivy League schools were in a years-long argument with the NCAA over player eligibility, Cornell declined their invitation and it went to the third place team, Boston University. The teams first appearance in the national tournament in 6 years went great. both of their games finished with 3-goal margins, the team won both matches and finished in first place.

After graduating, Ross enlisted in the marines. After serving in the Vietnam War he left the military but continued his public service by working as an officer in the New Jersey Police Department. He was inducted into the Boston University Athletic Hall of Fame in 1978.

Career statistics

Regular season and playoffs

Awards and honors

References

External links

Year of birth missing (living people)
Living people
American men's ice hockey defensemen
Ice hockey players from Massachusetts
People from West Roxbury, Boston
Boston University Terriers men's ice hockey players
AHCA Division I men's ice hockey All-Americans
United States Marines
United States Marine Corps personnel of the Vietnam War